Enzo Daniel Martínez (born 17 January 1997) is an Argentine professional footballer who plays as a left-back for Barracas Central.

Career
Martínez's career began with River Plate; he never featured for the first team but did represent the U20s at the 2016 U-20 Copa Libertadores in Paraguay, making two appearances. On 9 February 2017, Martínez was loaned to Estudiantes of Primera B Nacional. He subsequently scored one goal, versus Central Córdoba, in seventeen appearances. He returned to River Plate in July, prior to being let go in August to join Independiente. He departed in mid-2018 having not appeared at first-team level, though was an unused substitute for a league match with Arsenal de Sarandí in December 2017.

In the summer of 2020, Martínez joined Barracas Central.

Career statistics
.

References

External links

1997 births
Living people
Sportspeople from Buenos Aires Province
Argentine footballers
Association football defenders
Primera Nacional players
Club Atlético River Plate footballers
Club Sportivo Estudiantes players
Club Atlético Independiente footballers
Barracas Central players